Habib Ben Ali, also known as Moncef El Habib Ben Ali ( or ; born on August 21, 1941 and died on May 15, 1996 in Tunis) was a Tunisian criminal and younger brother of former President Zine el-Abidine Ben Ali.

Activities
In France, his base was in Belleville from where he managed drug trafficking as well as other criminal activities (procuring, racketeering, etc.). He also owned cafes, pizzerias, agriculture and real estate as well as import-export companies in IT and luxury cars.

Trial and sentencing
He was sentenced in absentia, in the so-called couscous connection case, on November 30, 1992 to ten years in prison and an indefinite ban on access to French territory by the 14th Chamber of the Correctional Court of Paris. He was accused of having transported money from international trafficking in heroin and cocaine between the Netherlands, France and Tunisia while his lawyer, Jean-Yves Leborgne, denounced a "political manipulation" repeating that he had "no material proof" that Moncef participated in "money laundering." Moreover, Moncef was not present at his trial which began on 17 November.

Following the 2011 revolution, several other members of the Ben Ali and Trabelsi families were arrested and prosecuted.

Disappearance
On May 15, 1996, he was found dead without having served his sentence in an apartment in Tunis "in circumstances still not fully understood." Tunisian activist Sadri Khiari suspected he may have been assassinated. He was buried on the same day at the cemetery of Hammam Sousse.

His body was exhumed on May 3, 2012 so it could be autopsied.

References

1941 births
1996 deaths
20th-century Tunisian criminals
Tunisian drug traffickers
People convicted of money laundering
Tunisian money launderers